"House of the Lord" is a song by American contemporary Christian musician Phil Wickham. The song was released on April 2, 2021, as the second single from his eighth studio album, Hymn of Heaven (2021). Wickham co-wrote the song with Jonathan Smith. Jonathan Smith produced the single.

"House of the Lord" peaked at number one on the US Hot Christian Songs chart. The song also went on to peak at number twelve on the Bubbling Under Hot 100 chart. "House of the Lord" received two GMA Dove Award nominations for Song of the Year and Pop/Contemporary Recorded Song of the Year at the 2022 GMA Dove Awards.

Background
On April 2, 2021, Phil Wickham released "House of the Lord" as the second single from his upcoming album, Hymn of Heaven (2021). Wickham shared the story behind the song, saying: 

On May 7, 2021, the radio team of Fair Trade Services announced that "House of the Lord" will be serviced to Christian radio in the United States, the official add date for the single slated on July 2, 2021.

Composition

Reception

Critical response
Jonathan Andre of 365 Days of Inspiring Media gave a positive review of the song, saying that it "keeps our focus on things above, to realign from our own immediate circumstances, to being reminded that God is in our midst wherever we are, that His moving in our lives, either through healing physically, mentally, or even spiritually, needs to be declared and recognised, and such a song as this, does this very fact."

Accolades

Commercial performance
"House of the Lord" debuted at No. 35 on the US Hot Christian Songs chart dated April 17, 2021. The song reached number one on the Hot Christian Songs chart dated January 29, 2022, becoming Wickham's first Hot Christian Songs chart number one hit in his career.

"House of the Lord" debuted at number 39 on the US Christian Airplay chart dated June 15, 2021. "House of the Lord" reached number one on the Christian Airplay chart dated October 16, 2021, after twenty weeks, becoming Wickham's fastest ascent to the top of the chart as well as his third chart-topping entry following "Battle Belongs" and "This Is Amazing Grace".

Music videos
The lyric video of "House of the Lord" was published on Phil Wickham's YouTube channel on April 2, 2021. The official music video for "House of the Lord" was availed by Phil Wickham on April 10, 2021, to YouTube. On April 30, 2021, Phil Wickham released the acoustic performance video of the song on YouTube.

Charts

Weekly charts

Year-end charts

Release history

References

External links
 

2021 songs
2021 singles
Contemporary Christian songs
Phil Wickham songs
Songs written by Phil Wickham